Shchekatikhino is a rural locality (a khutor) in Baninsky Selsoviet Rural Settlement, Fatezhsky District, Kursk Oblast, Russia. Population:

Geography 
The khutor is located on the Gnilovodchik River (a link tributary of the Usozha in the basin of the Svapa), 112 km from the Russia–Ukraine border, 49 km north-west of Kursk, 9 km north-east of the district center – the town Fatezh, 7.5 km from the selsoviet center – Chermoshnoy.

 Climate
Shchekatikhino has a warm-summer humid continental climate (Dfb in the Köppen climate classification).

Transport 
Shchekatikhino is located 7.5 km from the federal route  Crimea Highway as part of the European route E105, 8 km from the road of regional importance  (Verkhny Lyubazh – Ponyri), 0.5 km from the road of intermunicipal significance  (M2 "Crimea Highway" – Sotnikovo), 22 km from the nearest railway station Vozy (railway line Oryol – Kursk).

The rural locality is situated 50 km from Kursk Vostochny Airport, 172 km from Belgorod International Airport and 228 km from Voronezh Peter the Great Airport.

References

Notes

Sources

Rural localities in Fatezhsky District